20th BSFC Awards
December 12, 1999

Best Film: 
 Three Kings 
The 20th Boston Society of Film Critics Awards honored the best films of 1999. The awards were given on 12 December 1999.

Winners
Best Film:
Three Kings
Best Actor:
Jim Carrey – Man on the Moon
Best Actress: 
Hilary Swank – Boys Don't Cry
Best Supporting Actor:
Christopher Plummer – The Insider
Best Supporting Actress: 
Chloë Sevigny – Boys Don't Cry
Best Director:
David O. Russell – Three Kings
Best Screenplay: 
Charlie Kaufman – Being John Malkovich
Best Cinematography: 
Emmanuel Lubezki – Sleepy Hollow
Best Documentary:
Hands on a Hard Body: The Documentary
Best Foreign-Language Film: 
All About My Mother (Todo sobre mi madre) • Spain/France
Best New Filmmaker: 
Kimberly Peirce – Boys Don't Cry

External links
Past Winners

References
‘Kings’ takes gold Variety
`KINGS,' SWANK TOP BOSTON CRITIC PICKS The Boston Globe
Boston film critics crown 'Three Kings' best picture hollywood.com
1999 Boston Society of Film Critics Awards Internet Movie Database

1999
1999 film awards
1999 awards in the United States
1999 in Boston
December 1999 events in the United States